Patpong is an entertainment district in Bangkok's Bang Rak District, Thailand, catering mainly, though not exclusively, to foreign tourists and expatriates. While Patpong is internationally known as a red light district at the heart of Bangkok's sex industry, it is in fact only one of several red-light districts with some catering primarily to Thai men while others, like Patpong, cater primarily to foreigners.

A busy night market aimed at tourists is also located in Patpong.

Location and layout
Patpong consists of two parallel side streets running between Silom and Surawong Roads and one side street running from the opposite side of Surawong. Patpong is within walking distance from the BTS Skytrain Silom Line's Sala Daeng Station, and MRT Blue Line's Si Lom Station.

Patpong 1 is the main street with many bars of various kinds. Patpong 2 also has many similar bars. Next to these lies Soi Jaruwan, sometimes referred to as Patpong 3 but best known as Silom Soi 4. It has long catered to gay men, whilst nearby Soi Thaniya has expensive bars with Thai hostesses that cater almost exclusively to Japanese men.

History and ownership
Patpong gets its name from the family that owns much of the area's property, the Patpongpanich (or Patpongpanit), immigrants from Hainan Island, China, who purchased the area in 1946. At that time it was an undeveloped plot of land on the outskirts of the city. A small klong (canal) and a teakwood house were the only features. The family built a road – now called Patpong 1 – and several shop buildings, which were rented out. Patpong 2 was added later, and both roads are private property and not city streets. Patpong 3 and Soi Thaniya are not owned by the Patpongpanich family. The old teak house was demolished long ago and the klong was filled in to make room for more shops. Originally Patpong was an ordinary business area, but the arrival of bars eventually drove out most of the other businesses.

By 1968, a handful of nightclubs existed in the area, and Patpong became an R&R (rest and recuperation) stop for US military officers serving in the Vietnam War, although the main R&R area for GIs was along New Petchburi Road, nicknamed "The Golden Mile". In its prime during the 1970s and 1980s, Patpong was the premier nightlife area in Bangkok for foreigners, and was famous for its sexually explicit shows. In the mid-1980s the sois hosted an annual Patpong Mardi Gras, which was a weekend street fair that raised money for Thai charities. In the early-1990s, however, the Patpongpanich family turned the sidewalks of Patpong 1 Road into a night market, renting out spaces to street vendors.

The consequence was that Patpong lost much of its vibrancy as a nightlife strip, becoming crowded with tourist shoppers who ignored the nightlife. Nana Plaza and Soi Cowboy drew away many of Patpong's thrill seekers. Patpong became a designated "entertainment zone" in 2004, along with Royal City Avenue (RCA) and portions of Ratchadapisek Road, where the largest commercial sex venues are found. This designation allows its bars to stay open until 02:00, instead of the 24:00 or 01:00 legal closing times enforced in other areas.

In October 2019 the Patpong Museum opened in Patpong Soi 2, housing a collection of art, antiques and displays covering 70 years of Patpong's history. The privately owned museum is located on the 2nd floor of building 5 opposite Foodland supermarket and below Black Pagoda, and is open from 10am to 10pm.

In media
Many Western films have featured Patpong, including The Deer Hunter (1978). The final part of the musical Miss Saigon (1989) is set in the Patpong bar scene.

The song Welcome to Thailand from the 1987 studio album of the same name by the Thai rock band Carabao contains the lyrics: "Tom, Tom, where you go last night?... I love Meuang Thai. I like Patpong ".  The song complains that Farang tourists (Westerners) are often attracted to the sleazy side of Thailand (the sex tourism of Patpong and Pattaya).

The movie Baraka features several shots of strippers in Patpong.

The 1994 book Patpong Sisters: An American Woman's View of the Bangkok Sex World by Cleo Odzer describes the experiences of an anthropologist doing field research in Thailand.

Patpong: Bangkok's Twilight Zone (2001, by Nick Nostitz) is a photographic depiction of aspects of the Patpong night life.

The 2008 book Ladyboys: The Secret World of Thailand's Third Gender paints a portrait of Thailand's kathoeys.

Patpong opera is a collection of songs written by Kevin Wood, manager of Radio City, to tunes of modern rock songs. Together they tell the story of the people in Patpong.

Patpong serves as part of the setting in Tom Robbins' book Villa Incognito.

See also
 Prostitution in Thailand

References

External links
 

Neighbourhoods of Bangkok
Tourist attractions in Bangkok
Red-light districts in Thailand
Bang Rak district